TOP gogo, season 2 was the second season of TOP gogo and was hosted by Georgian model Nino Tskitishvili. The judging panel consisted of fashion designer Avtandil Tskvitinidze and photographer Sasha Prishvini. In contrast to the first cycle, the castings were held in countries of the former Soviet Union (Belarus, Latvia, Kazakhstan, Russia and Ukraine respectively). The judges communicated with the contestants in Russian, and this was subtitled in Georgian.

The winner of the competition was 22-year-old Alisa Kuzmina from St. Petersburg, Russia. As her prizes, she received a brand new Mazda car, a one-year supply of eyewear along with beauty salon and clinic services, the opportunity to build a complete and professional modeling portfolio, a cash prize courtesy of VTB, and a twelve-month modeling contract with Das Models Milano in Milan. In addition, she was also given a three-year contract with Look Models in Georgia.

Contestants
(ages stated are at start of contest)

Summaries

Call-out order

 The contestant was eliminated
 The contestant quit the competition
  The contestant was put through collectively to the next round 
 The contestant was the original eliminee but was saved
 The contestant was part of a non-elimination bottom two
 The contestant won the competition

 In episodes 1,2, 10, 13, 17, 19, 20, and 22 there was no elimination.
 In episode 1, the foreign girls were introduced. Episode 2 focused on the girls from Georgia. 
 In episode 5, Tanya decided to withdraw from the competition due to personal reasons.
 In episode 6 it was revealed that Maria N, who had been eliminated in the former episode, would remain in the competition due to Tanya's withdrawal.
 In episode 8, only the top two performing girls and the eliminated girl were announced.
 In episode 11, Yulia L quit the competition after the elimination of Maria Y, with whom she was in the bottom three. At the end of the episode, Alisa and Maria N were nominated for elimination by the other contestants. 
 In episode 12 the judges only had to decide whom to save between Alisa and Maria N.
 In episode 14, the shoot was replaced by a runway show. The double elimination for the episode was based on the models' performance during the show. Additionally, Eka re-entered the competition.
 In episode 15, Yulia M had originally been eliminated. She was saved due to the double elimination the previous episode.
 The elimination in episode 23 was based upon the girls' performance on the shoot in episode 22.
 The elimination in episode 24 was based on both the girls' performance on the shoot in episode 23 and the new shoot in episode 24.

Photo shoot guide
Episode 3 photo shoot: Emotional beauty shots
Episode 4 photo shoot: Elegant and rich housewives from the 1940s
Episode 5 photo shoot: Gothic girls in a factory
Episode 6 photo shoot: Sexy sport women
Episode 7 photo shoot: Movement editorial
Episode 8 photo shoot: Traditional Georgian clothing in pairs
Episode 9 photo shoot: Embodying fashion from the 60s in a hair salon
Episode 11 photo shoot: Hemophilia beauty shots with jewelry
Episode 12 photo shoot: Portraying the four seasons
Episode 13 photo shoot: Posing in lingerie
Episode 15 photo shoots: Whimsical princesses
Episode 16 photo shoot: Boats in a lake
Episode 18 commercial: Campy coffee 
Episode 20 photo shoot: Bikinis in the beach
Episode 21 photo shoot: Editorial swimwear & beachwear
Episode 22 photo shoots: Swimming pool love triangle; floating with fabric in a pool
Episode 23 photo shoots: Lenses beauty shots; sexy car washing hoes
Episode 24 photo shoot: Luggage advertisements

References

2013 television seasons
Modeling-themed television series